Danny Dunn on the Ocean Floor is the fifth novel in the Danny Dunn series of juvenile science fiction/adventure books written by Raymond Abrashkin and Jay Williams. The book was first published in 1960.

Plot 
Another accident in Professor Bulfinch's laboratory, instigated by Danny, results in the creation of a transparent, resilient material.  The material proves useful in creating a bathysphere, and Professor Bulfinch, along with his friend Dr. Grimes, Danny, Joe, and Irene, descend into the Pacific Ocean on an experimental voyage.  Unfortunately, the bathysphere's pilot is rendered unconscious, and the bathysphere becomes trapped in a cave. On their journey, the submarine is examined by a giant squid and attacked by a large shark.

Reception
Floyd C. Gale of Galaxy Science Fiction rated the book 4.5 stars out of five for those aged eight to twelve.

Editions 
McGraw-Hill
 (Paperback, 1960, illustrated by Brinton Turkel)
 (Hardback, 1960, illustrated by Brinton Turkel)

MacDonald and Jane's
 Hardback, 1967, illustrated by Dick Hart)

Pocket Books/Archway Books
 (Paperback, 1979, #9 in their series, illustrated by Brinton Turkel)
 (Paperback, 1983 reissue, illustrated by Brinton Turkel)

References

Danny Dunn
1960 American novels
1960 children's books
1960 science fiction novels